Vitaliy Kosovskyi (born 11 August 1973) is a former football midfielder for Dynamo Kyiv and a Ukraine international.

Career
Born in Ostroh, Rivne Oblast, his first steps in football Kosovskyi started when he went to the first grade of school as it happened to be that near the school was also located a children-youth sports school. Kosovskyi explained that his father worked as a driver in Netishyn which is located in neighboring Khmelnytskyi Oblast. When in Netishyn started to be built the Khmelnytskyi Nuclear Power Plant, in 1984 Netishyn was granted the status of city and around that time the Kosovskyi family received a new apartment to which they moved.

Dynamo Kyiv
Kosovskyi is notable for representing Dynamo Kyiv in the late 1990s alongside Serhii Rebrov and Andriy Shevchenko, usually playing the starting left winger. Kosovskyi's career was cut short in the early 2000s by numerous injuries, which prevented his numerous comeback attempts. Following a 9-year career with Dynamo, Kosovsky retired in 2003 to be a scout for Dynamo Kyiv.

International
During his international career, Kosovskyi has amassed 25 caps, scoring 2 goals.

References

External links
 
 
 
 Anton Svetlichny. Kosovskyi: with him and without (Косовский: с ним и без него). Sport.ua. 6 February 2009.

1973 births
Living people
People from Ostroh
Ukrainian footballers
Ukraine international footballers
Ukraine under-21 international footballers
Ukrainian Premier League players
FC Dynamo Kyiv players
FC Dynamo-2 Kyiv players
FC Podillya Khmelnytskyi players
FC Nyva Vinnytsia players
FC Irpin Horenychi players
Association football midfielders
Ukrainian football managers
FC Vorskla Poltava managers
Sportspeople from Rivne Oblast